Eric Fenton (born July 17, 1969) is an American former professional ice hockey player. He was selected by the New York Rangers in the 10th round (202nd overall) of the 1988 NHL Entry Draft.

On August 4, 1993 Fenton signed a professional contract with the Portland Pirates, becoming the first member of the fledgling American Hockey league team.

Career statistics

References

External links

1969 births
Living people
American men's ice hockey right wingers
Charlotte Checkers (1993–2010) players
Hampton Roads Admirals players
Maine Black Bears men's ice hockey players
Milwaukee Admirals (IHL) players
Newcastle Jesters players
New York Rangers draft picks
Peoria Rivermen (IHL) players
Portland Pirates players
Saginaw Generals players
Ice hockey players from New York (state)
Sportspeople from Troy, New York
North Yarmouth Academy alumni
NCAA men's ice hockey national champions